Blackie is an English and Scottish surname. Notable people with the surname include:

Charles Blackie, New Zealand judge
Don Blackie (1882–1955), Australian cricketer
Ernest Blackie (1867–1943), English Anglican priest
Fergus Blackie, Zimbabwean judge and lawyer
John Stuart Blackie (1809–1895), Scottish scholar
Josh Blackie (born 1979), New Zealand rugby union player
Margery Blackie (1898–1981), British physician
Sid Blackie (1899–1966), English footballer

English-language surnames
Scottish surnames